Vanderhoef is a surname. Notable people with the surname include:

Larry N. Vanderhoef (1941–2015), American biochemist and academic
Marion Vanderhoef (1894–1985), American tennis player

Surnames of Dutch origin